The Pirate Party Ireland was an unregistered minor political party in Ireland, modelled on the Swedish Pirate Party. The party was founded in May 2009 after discussions on the Pirate Parties International website and re-founded in April 2012. The Irish party began to gain attention after the official registration of Pirate Party UK on 30 July 2009.

History
Discussions were started on the Pirate Parties International discussion forum in 2007 relating to setting up an Irish Pirate Party. A small number of people were involved in the talks at the time and little was done apart from some basic planning and writing of a party constitution. In 2009 more people joined the discussions and shortly thereafter the party set up its own website, inititially in the format of a forum.

The party claimed to have exceeded membership of 300 on the 30 May 2010, the minimum required number to register as a political party in the country. However, in the run-up to the 2011 Irish election, the party was not able to hold a national convention in order to fulfill one of the requirements of registration. Interest in the party seemed to wane, the party did not contend in the election and in March 2011 a note was placed on the party website stating it was disbanding. In March 2011 the party dissolved.

The Party was re-founded in April 2012 and a new website 'www.pirateparty.ie' was set up and the party has again started to invite new membership and initiated various debates on the party's forum. In June 2012 the Pirate Party of Ireland was removed from the list of Members of the Pirate Parties International by the decision of the PPI's Court of Arbitration, clarifying that the new Pirate Party Ireland is not a continuation of the old one. As of September 2014, the party's website is "down for maintenance", and the party appears to be defunct.

DU Pirate Party is a separate organisation open to Trinity College Dublin (Dublin University) students and staff. The student-led society has been in operation since 2009 and has undergone yearly changes in committee.

Pirate Party core principles 
The core principles of the party are:
 Copyright reform
 Patent reform
 Increases in, and protection of, civil liberties
 Transparent government

References 

Ireland
2009 in Ireland
Political advocacy groups in the Republic of Ireland
Defunct political parties in the Republic of Ireland